The Middle Run Formation is a geologic formation in Ohio. It dates back to the Precambrian.
It was discovered in October 1987 when the United States Geological Survey dug a sample to learn more about Ohio's  Precambrian basement rocks.  Scientists estimated the boundary to be at 3,500 ft below the surface.  After drilling through Mt. Simon sandstone, past the 3,500 ft mark, they were surprised to find more sandstone, which is the Middle Run Formation.  Drilling in 1989 reached a depth of 5,370 ft of this same formation before the drill bit was stuck—without reaching the Precambrian basement rocks.

References

 Generalized Stratigraphic Chart for Ohio

Geology of Ohio
Proterozoic Eonothem of North America